Ruben Markussen (born 23 March 1995), known mononymously as Ruben, is a Norwegian singer and songwriter. He grew up in Bjarkøy, a small village of 300 inhabitants in Harstad, northern Norway. His debut single "Walls" charted in Norway on the basis of huge streaming online charting on VG-lista, the official Norwegian Singles Chart, making it to number 8. As a result, he moved to Oslo to further his career. He was nominated for the Norwegian P3 Gold 2018 award in 2018 "Newcomer" category for the song during Spellemannprisen, receiving a scholarship. His follow up "Lay by Me" has charted in Norway, reaching number 8. Both singles also charted in Sweden. He is signed to Universal Records in Norway.

Discography

Extended plays

Singles

References

External links
 
 

Norwegian male singers
Norwegian songwriters
Norwegian pop singers
People from Bjarkøy
Musicians from Harstad
1995 births
Living people